Tony Tuff (born Winston Anthony Morris, on 1 April 1955, Kingston, Jamaica) is a reggae singer who was a member of The African Brothers in the late 1960s and 1970s before embarking on a solo career.

Biography
Tuff started his career in 1969 as a member of the vocal trio The African Brothers, along with Sugar Minott and Derrick "Bubbles" Howard. The African Brothers split up in the mid-1970s, and Tuff pursued other work outside music until he returned as a solo artist in the late 1970s, with the album Tony Tuff Meets Errol Schorder , split with Errol Scorcher, and self-productions including the "I'm So Glad" single on his own Winston label. He worked with Yabby You on the Tony Tuff album in 1980, and worked with Minott again on the 1981 album Presenting Mr. Tuff, released on Minott's Black Roots label. He worked on several sound systems in the late 1970s and 1980s, including Lees Unlimited and Henry "Junjo" Lawes' Volcano system. Lawes also produced several successful singles by Tuff including "Water Pumpee", and "Mix Me Down", and also produced his 1983 album Come Fe Mash It. He continued to be active during the 1980s, but was largely absent from the music scene in the 1990s. He returned in 2000, and has recorded several albums in the new millennium, including How Long, recorded with Jah Shaka. He toured Europe twice in 2002, before touring Canada and the United States.

Discography

Tony Tuff Meets Errol Schorder (1978), Mal's – with Errol Scorcher
Tony Tuff (1980), Grove Music/Island
Hustling (1981), Scorcher
Presenting Mr. Tuff (1981), Black Roots
Reggae in the City (1981), TR International
Tuff Selection (1982), Island
Come Fe Mash It (1983), Volcano
Render Your Heart (1984), CSA
Wha We A Go Do (1984), Top Rank
Ketch A Fire (1986), Hawkeye
Keep the Faith (1987), Black Scorpio
From Tony Tuff To Lovers Everywhere (198?), TR International
Singers Reggae Showcase (2000), Jamaican Vibes
Link Up (2001), Rhino
Hit & Run (2001), Prestige Elite
Say Something (2006), Groove Attack/Minor 7 Flat 5
How Long (2006), Jah Shaka Music
How Long Dub (2009), Jah Shaka Music – Jah Shaka featuring Tony Tuff
 Tony Tuff & Jah Stitch – Rumours of War / Dragon, Snake & Spider

Compilations
The Best of Tony Tuff (1983), Vista Sounds
20 Super Hits (19??), Sonic Sounds

References

External links
Tony Tuff at Roots Archives

1955 births
Living people
Musicians from Kingston, Jamaica
Jamaican reggae singers
Jamaican male singers